The European Bobsleigh and Skeleton Championships is the main bobsleigh and skeleton championships in Europe.

Bobsleigh

Two-man 

Medal table

Four-man 

Medal table

Two-woman 

Medal table

Women's Monobob 

Medal table

Skeleton

Men's individual

Medal table

Women's individual

Medal table

European Bobsleigh and Skeleton Championships cumulative medal count
Updated after the IBSF European Championships 2023

Bobsleigh

Skeleton

Overall

Most successful athletes (by number of victories)
Boldface denotes active athletes and highest medal count among all athletes (including these who not included in these tables) per type. "Position" denotes position of bobsledder in a crew (P – bobsledder won all own medals as a pilot; B – bobsledder won all own medals as a brakeman / brakewoman and / or as a pusher; B/P – bobsledder won own medals firstly as a brakeman / brakewoman and / or as a pusher and then as a pilot).

Men's Bobsleigh

Women's Bobsleigh

Men's Skeleton

Women's Skeleton

References

Bobsleigh competitions
Skeleton competitions
European championships